Anacostia  is a historic neighborhood in Southeast Washington, D.C. Its downtown is located at the intersection of Good Hope Road and Martin Luther King Jr. Avenue. It is located east of the Anacostia River, after which the neighborhood is named. 

Anacostia includes all of the Anacostia Historic District, which was listed on the National Register of Historic Places in 1978. Often the name "Anacostia" is used to refer to the entire portion of the city that is southeast of the Anacostia River. The Anacostia Business Improvement District is responsible for the development of the area.

History
The name "Anacostia" comes from the anglicized name of a Nacochtank settlement along the Anacostia River. Captain John Smith explored the area in 1608, traveling up the "Eastern Branch"—later the Anacostia River—mistaking it for the main body of the Potomac River, and met Anacostans. Before the arrival of whites, the Nacostine villages in this area were a lively center of trade visited by Native Americans such as the Iroquois of New York. Even after the founding of Maryland, Leonard Calvert, in a letter to a merchant in London, described "Anacostan" as one of the three best places in the colony for trading with natives.

Around the year 1668, native peoples previously living south of Anacostia were forced northward by war. Anacostine Island, which first appeared on a 1670 map drawn by Augustine Herman, was settled by the Anacostans around this time.

The core of what is now the Anacostia historic district was incorporated in 1854 as Uniontown and was one of the early suburbs in the District of Columbia. It was designed to be affordable for Washington's working class, many of whom were employed across the river at the Navy Yard; its (then) location outside of and isolated from the city made its real estate inexpensive. The initial subdivision of 1854 carried restrictive covenants prohibiting the sale, rental or lease of property to anyone of African or Irish descent. Abolitionist Frederick Douglass, often called "the sage of Anacostia", bought Cedar Hill, the estate belonging to the developer of Uniontown, in 1877 and lived there until he died in 1895. The home is still maintained as the Frederick Douglass National Historic Site in Anacostia.

During the Civil War, Anacostia was protected by a series of forts upon the hills southwest of the city. Following the conclusion of the war, the forts were dismantled and the land returned to its original owners.

Anacostia, always part of the District of Columbia, became a part of the city of Washington when the city and District became coterminous in 1878.
On January 27, 1886, the House of Representatives Committee on the District of Columbia voted in favor of renaming Uniontown to Anacostia. After the bill passed the House of Representatives, the Senate also voted in favor of the name change. The name change became effective on April 22, 1886. At the time, property deeds restricted land ownership to people who were white, and therefore Anacostia had only white residents.

The opening of the Pennsylvania Avenue Bridge in 1890 began to link Anacostia to the rest of the District of Columbia.

Great Depression

In 1932, during the Great Depression, unemployed World War I veterans from all across the country marched on Washington to demand immediate payment of a bonus promised to them. The event became known as the Bonus Army Conflict. Most of the Bonus Army camped on Anacostia Flats, a swampy, muddy area along the Anacostia River later reclaimed as Anacostia Park/Fairlawn Park. Fearing civil unrest, the President ordered the military to disperse the campers from Washington. The Army Chief of Staff General Douglas MacArthur dispersed them, but exceeded the orders of President Herbert Hoover by crossing the bridge to Anacostia and torching the veteran's encampment.  MacArthur believed that the Bonus Army was composed of and led by Communists. George Patton and Dwight Eisenhower served under MacArthur during these events.

Post-war years
Anacostia's population remained predominantly European-American up until the late 1950s and early 1960s, with whites comprising 87% of the population. During the 1960s, the Anacostia Freeway (I-295) was constructed. The highway imposed a barrier between the Anacostia neighborhood and the Anacostia River waterfront. Numerous public housing apartment complexes were built in the neighborhood. With the flight of much of the middle class out of the neighborhood during the late 1950s and 1960s with the opportunity to move to newer housing in postwar suburbs, Anacostia's demographics changed dramatically as the neighborhood became predominantly African American. Interactions between the area's white and black residents were often contentious, as was the case in the 1949 Anacostia riot at a desegregated public pool.

Shopping, dining, and entertainment facilities throughout greater Anacostia are limited, as development slowed with a decrease in income in the area. Residents often must travel to either the suburbs or downtown Washington for these services. Anacostia, however, does have a year-round ice skating rink at Fort Dupont Park; the city police boys' club; and a tennis and learning center, combining sports with academic tutoring in Congress Heights.

St. Elizabeth's Hospital, D.C. Village and the Blue Plains sewage treatment plant were long-established Anacostia developments noted in a late-1990s report. The report also cited attention to the area at that time from Hillary Clinton and Newt Gingrich.

In 2005, Building Bridges Across the River opened the 110,000-square-foot (10,000 m2) Town Hall Education Arts Recreation Campus (THEARC) which is home to eleven nonprofit organizations, all of which share the goal of helping children and adults reach their full potential. Free summer evening jazz concerts are also given weekly in Fort Dupont Park. The annual Martin Luther King Jr. Birthday Parade is a notable annual event along the Avenue bearing Dr. King's name. Starting in 2006 the annual parade date was changed from January to April. (Also see the separate article on Congress Heights). In January 2007 a new large supermarket opened to serve the neighborhood.

Geography
Anacostia downtown is located at the intersection of Good Hope Road and Martin Luther King Jr. Avenue. It is the most famous neighborhood in the Southeast quadrant of Washington, located east of the Anacostia River, after which the neighborhood is named.

Demographics
As of the 2010 Census, Anacostia's population is 92% African-American, 5% Non-Hispanic White, and 3% other.

Landmarks
The Anacostia Historic District is listed on the National Register of Historic Places as a historic district, and it retains much of its mid-to-late 19th-century low-scale, working-class character, as is evident in its architecture.

In 1957, an Anacostia landmark, the "world's largest chair", was installed at the corner of Martin Luther King Jr. Avenue and V Street SE. The chair was installed by the Curtis Brothers Furniture Company and built by Bassett Furniture. In the summer of 2005, the "Big Chair" was removed for repairs, then returned in April 2006.

Industry
Notable facilities in the area include Joint Base Anacostia–Bolling (formerly Bolling Air Force Base and Naval Support Facility Anacostia).

Tourism 
Founded in 2000, the Anacostia Waterfront Initiative is revitalizing a  piece of the Anacostia River waterfront to promote the community. Plans include numerous parks restored of their natural wetlands and forests, canoe tie-ups, a playground, a four-acre 9/11 memorial grove, and an environmental education center. Studios Architecture was chosen to be the architect of the project, while the administrating agency will be the Anacostia Waterfront Corporation.

Hospitals 
 St. Elizabeths Hospital (more than 100 years old)
 United Medical Center (formally Greater Southeast Community Hospital)

Education
District of Columbia Public Schools operates public schools. Anacostia High School serves Anacostia. Ballou High School is in southern Anacostia. The area has a number of middle and elementary schools, and is also the location of Thurgood Marshall Academy.

Culture
The Anacostia Museum, a branch of the Smithsonian Institution, was established in 1967 by S. Dillon Ripley, then-Secretary of the Smithsonian Institution.
The Anacostia Arts Center and Honfleur Gallery, located near the corner of Martin Luther Jr. King Ave and Good Hope Road is a gallery showcasing nationally known works alongside that of local artists. It hosts a bi-monthly poetry series called Intersections, sponsored by the American Poetry Museum.
District of Columbia Public Library operates the Anacostia Neighborhood Library.
Cedar Hill, the home of abolitionist Frederick Douglass, known as the "Lion of Anacostia", sits atop a hill overlooking the Anacostia neighborhood on W Street SE.
 The Anacostia Playhouse brings in many different events to their blackbox theater which includes productions by Theater Alliance located at 2020 Shannon Place SE.

Cultural reference
In the 2007 film inspired by the life of Ralph Waldo 'Petey' Greene (played by Don Cheadle), Greene's straightlaced counterpart Dewey Hughes played by Chiwetel Ejiofor surprises all with his skill at '9 ball' pool. "Grew up in the Anacostia projects ... [and] made [my] way through school hustling", he explains about himself after their game in Talk to Me. The film is set in the late 1960s.

Transportation
The neighborhood, served by the Anacostia Metro station, is a 10-minute ride on Washington Metro's Green Line from downtown Washington; other Metro stations on the Green and Orange lines serve other parts of Greater Anacostia.

I-295 runs through the neighborhood; it connects to DC 295 further north, and these two routes make up the entire routing of the Anacostia Freeway.

Gallery

See also

 Congress Heights
 Fort Greble
 Fort Stanton
 Washington Bellevue
 Washington Hillcrest
 Washington Highlands

References

Further reading

External links

Anacostia Historic District
 Honfleur Gallery
 Anacostia Watershed Society
 Live Anacostia
Three Things About Poplar Point and Anacostia Flats
History of Anacostia  Documentary produced by WETA-TV
 Anacostia Waterfront Initiative
Why Is It Named Anacostia - Ghosts of DC blog

 
1854 establishments in Washington, D.C.
African-American history of Washington, D.C.
Populated places established in 1854
Working-class culture in Washington, D.C.